
Gmina Trawniki is an upstate gmina (administrative district) in Świdnik County, Lublin Voivodeship, in eastern Poland.

Villages
Gmina Trawniki contains the villages and settlements of Biskupice, Bonów, Dorohucza, Ewopole, Majdan Siostrzytowski, Oleśniki, Pełczyn, Siostrzytów, Struża, Struża-Kolonia, Trawniki and Trawniki-Kolonia.

Neighbouring gminas
Gmina Trawniki is bordered by the gminas of Fajsławice, Łopiennik Górny, Milejów, Piaski, Rejowiec Fabryczny and Siedliszcze.

References

Polish official population figures 2006

Trawniki
Świdnik County